Anna Zita Maria Stricker (born 3 July 1994) is an Austrian-born Italian professional racing cyclist, who last rode for UCI Women's Team .

Major results

2012
 2nd  Road race, UEC European Junior Road Championships
 3rd  Road race, UCI Junior Road World Championships
2014
 1st  Sprints classification, Vuelta a El Salvador
 4th GP Comune di Cornaredo
2015
 2nd Giro del Trentino Alto Adige-Südtirol
2016
 3rd Road race, National Road Championships
 3rd Overall Giro della Toscana Int. Femminile – Memorial Michela Fanini
1st Young rider classification
1st Stage 1
 8th Overall Tour de Bretagne Féminin
1st Mountains classification
2017
 1st  Mountains classification, Grand Prix Elsy Jacobs
 6th Overall Tour of Chongming Island

See also
 2014 Astana BePink Women's Team season

References

External links
 

1994 births
Living people
Italian female cyclists
Sportspeople from Tyrol (state)
People from Zams